The Battle of Añyraqai was a legendary battle that took place during the Kazakh-Dzungar Wars from December 1729 until January 1730. There are not many records about the Kazakh-Dzungar Wars because the Kazakh people did not have a written tradition of transmitting information. The folk legend about the battle recorded in 1905 by the researcher and collector of Kazakh folklore, A. A. Divaev, tells that the battle took place between Lakes Balkhash and Alakol in present-day Almaty Region. The war between Kazakhs and Dzungars lasted for 7 years (1723–1730). The war ended with the victory of a single force consisting of members from all three main clans (jüzes) under the supreme command of Kazakh ruler Abu'l-Khair Muhammed Khan (1710–1748).

Location 
The Añyraqai Mountains and Lake Alakol (Almaty region) were important strategic points during the entire period of the Kazakh-Dzungar confrontation. Access to the Sarysu, the Karkaraly Mountains and mountains of Ulytau took place from the river Chu. The different mountain landscapes provided good opportunities for cavalry attacks and maneuvers, and the tugai forests near the battle area allowed for covert concentration of troops.
The Anrakai gorge of Chu-Ili district is an important cultural and historical landmark, since the final battle and the end of the eight-year war took place here.

Forces 
There were near 30 thousand people – representatives of 3 main family on the Kazakh side.  Many famous Bahadurs participated in the battle, such as: Nauryzbai Bahadur, Karakyshpak Tleuli, Bogenbay Bahadur, Kabanbay Bahadur, Sanryk Toktybayuly, Barak Shorekuly, Tirtaul Olzhabay, Otegen Otegululy, Bogenbay Bozkosuly, Aksha Sartuly, Bopay biy, Kangeldy Srymbetuly, Alshin Taylak, Eserken Zamankarauly, Tole bi, Koygeldy Bahadur, Bekjan Bahadur, and others. The Jolbarıs Khan was chosen as the Supreme Khan of 3 main families.  Abu'l Khair Khan (Khan of the Younger Zhuz) carried the leadership of the combined forces. The Kazakh cavalry weapons consisted of bows and arrows, swords, combat knife, spear, battle axe (Aybalta), lashes-kamshi, clubs-soil and tools for catching horses and the enemy — Kuryk. Weapons also used. The Kazakh army had good intelligence, based on a good knowledge of the area.
The decisive battle of the Kazakhs and Dzungars took place at the foot of the Anrakai Mountain. The Kazakh United army won a decisive victory over the long years of the conflict. The battle of Anrakai became the decisive battle in the history of the Kazakh-Dzungar Wars, and its result was the preservation of the Kazakh lands in integrity. After this defeat, Dzungaria lost political unity as a state and civil strife began among the Oirat tribes, which subsequently led to a strong weakening of Dzungaria as a military and political force in the Central Asian region.

Folk legends about the battle of Anrakai were common in Western Semirechye among local old-timers, but due to the great distance of this region from the settled agricultural countries of Central Asia, they were out of sight of Russian, Muslim and Chinese chroniclers of that time.

A monument opened on the 35th kilometer of the highway Almaty – Bishkek. The monument is a composition of two monoliths standing in the center of a circle framed by 12 stones with signs of animals of the Turk 12-year cycle. The monument symbolizes the confrontation between the two peoples. A higher monolith made of red granite symbolizes Kazakhs, and a lower gray monolith symbolizes Dzungars.

References 
1. Kazakh-Dzungar Wars
2. History of Kazakhstan
3. The Anarakai battle  
4. М. Гинатуллин Лингво-краеведческий словарь. — Алматы: «Раритет», 2010.
5. https://mektep.kz/userfiles/9d21845451f07c165047ec83b9d6eda7.pdf

Battles involving the Kazakh Khanate